Drephalys is a Neotropical butterfly genus in the family Hesperiidae, in which it is placed in tribe Entheini. 

The genus was established in 1893 by Edward Yerbury Watson, who assigned Eudamus helixus (now Drephalys helixus) as type species of the genus.

Species
According to Li et al. 2019, the genus contains the following species across two subgenera:

Subgenus Paradrephalys Burns, 2000
 Drephalys oria Evans, 1952
 Drephalys oriander (Hewitson, 1867)
 Drephalys talboti (Le Cerf, 1922)
 Drephalys dumeril (Latreille, [1824])
 Drephalys croceus Austin, 1995
 Drephalys tortus Austin, 1995

Subgenus Drephalys E. Watson, 1893
 Drephalys alcmon (Cramer, 1780)
 Drephalys mourei O. Mielke, 1968
 Drephalys helixus (Hewitson, 1877)
 Drephalys kidonoi Burns, 2000
 Drephalys phoenicoides (Mabille & Boullet, 1919)
 Drephalys phoenice (Hewitson, 1867)
 Drephalys heraclides E. Bell, 1942
 Drephalys citrinus Madruga, Siewert, O. Mielke & Casagrande, 2018
 Drephalys dracarys Madruga, Siewert, O. Mielke & Dolibaina, 2018
 Drephalys electrinus Siewert, Madruga, O. Mielke & Dolibaina, 2018
 Drephalys miersi O. Mielke, 1968
 Drephalys opifex Evans, 1952
 Drephalys olvina Evans, 1952
 Drephalys olva Evans, 1952
 Drephalys eous (Hewitson, 1867)

Original publication

References

Natural History Museum Lepidoptera genus database

Eudaminae
Hesperiidae genera
Taxa named by Edward Yerbury Watson